The Laurel Cardinals was the final moniker of the minor league baseball teams based in Laurel, Mississippi. From 1923 to 1929, Laurel teams played exclusively as a member of the Cotton States League, hosting home games at Kamper Park. The Laurel Cardinals were minor league affiliates of the St. Louis Cardinals in 1928 and 1929, having first played as the Laurel "Lumberjacks."

History
Laurel, Mississippi first hosted minor league baseball in 1923. The Laurel Lumberjacks became members of the eight–team Class D level Cotton States League. The Clarksdale Cubs, Greenville Swamp Angels, Greenwood Indians, Hattiesburg Hubmen, Jackson Red Sox, Meridian Mets and Vicksburg Hill Billies joined Laurel in league play.

On April 18, 1923, the Laurel Lumberjacks began league play in their first season of play. On July 24, 1923, the Cotton States League stopped play for the season. With a record of 43–35, Laurel finished in a 2nd place tie with the Greenwood Indians in the eight–team league. Laurel finished 1.5 games behind the Greenville Swamp Angels. They were managed by Charles Hodge and Bill Statham. Player/manager Bill Statham of Laurel led the Cotton States League with 17 wins.

The 1924 season saw The Cotton League return to play as a six–team Class D league. The Laurel Lumberjacks ended the 1924 Cotton States League season schedule with a record of 43–57, placing 5th in the final standings. Managed by Baxter Sparks, Pat Boyd and Ed McDonald, Laurel finished 22.5 games behind the 1st place Hattiesburg Hubmen.

Led by managers Jake Propst, Jim Moore, Pat Devereaux and Sammy Vick, the 1925 Laurel Lumberjacks placed 5th in the Cotton States League final standings. Laurel had a regular season record of 58–64 and finished 12.0 games behind the 1st place Meridian Mets in the eight–team league.

The 1926 Laurel Lumberjacks continued play in the Cotton States League. Laurel ended the season with a record of 59–61 to place 5th in the league standings, playing under managers Sammy Vick and Bill Statham. The Lumberjacks finished 16.5 games behind the 1st place Hattiesburg Pinetoppers in the final Cotton States League final standings.

With a record of 41–70, the 1927 Laurel Lumberjacks last in the Cotton States League. Under managers Frank Matthews and Buck Stapleton, the Laurel Lumberjacks placed 8th in the eight–team league, finishing  29.0 games behind the 1st place Jackson Red Sox.

The Laurel "Cardinals" continued play in the 1928 Cotton States League, as the franchise became an affiliate of the St. Louis Cardinals Laurel finished the regular season with a 44–78 overall record to place 7th in the league, which had two halves. Managed by John Ganzel and Bobby Schang, Laurel finished 33.0 games behind the 1st place Jackson Red Sox in the final overall standings.

In their final season of play, continuing Cotton States League membership, the 1929 Laurel Cardinals placed 4th in the eight–team league. Playing under manager Clay Hopper, the Cardinals finished with a 59–63 regular season record. Laurel finished 14.0 games behind the 1st place Alexandria Reds. The Laurel franchise permanently folded following the 1929 season.

Laurel, Mississippi has not hosted another minor league team.

The ballparks
Laurel minor league teams played home games at Kamper Park. Today, Kamper Park is still in use today as a public park with baseball fields and a zoo. Kamper Park is located at 107 South 17th Avenue, Laurel, Mississippi.

Timeline

Year–by–year record

Notable alumni

Joe Berry (1927)
Ed Chapman (1928)
Como Cotelle (1929)
Clarence Heise (1928)
Clay Hopper (1929, MGR)
Joel Hunt (1928)
George Jackson (1929)
Ray Moss (1924)
Tim Murchison (1927)
Bill Norman (1929)
Tom Oliver (1923)
Ray Pepper (1928)
Red Rollings (1924–1925)
Bobby Schang (1928, MGR)
Merle Settlemire (1925)
Elmer Tutwiler (1925–1926)
Sammy Vick (1925, MGR)
Lon Warneke (1928) 5x MLB All–Star
Al Williamson (1925)

See also
Laurel Lumberjacks playersLaurel Cardinals players

References

External links
Baseball Reference

Defunct minor league baseball teams
Jones County, Mississippi
Defunct baseball teams in Mississippi
St. Louis Cardinals minor league affiliates
Cotton States League teams
Baseball teams established in 1928
Baseball teams disestablished in 1929